"Imaginationland Episode I" is the tenth episode of the eleventh season and the 163rd overall episode of the American animated television series South Park. It premiered on Comedy Central in the United States on October 17, 2007. The episode was rated TV-MA LV in the United States. It is the first episode in a three-part story arc that won the 2008 Emmy for "Outstanding Animated Program for One Hour or More". The three episodes were later reissued together, along with previously unreleased footage, as the uncensored Imaginationland: The Movie.

In the episode, Cartman swears that he has seen a leprechaun. Then, Stan and Kyle visit "Imaginationland", a land with imaginary beings.

Plot summary 

The episode begins with Cartman directing the other boys through a forest in search of a leprechaun. A skeptical Kyle is there, having made a bet that if Cartman can prove leprechauns exist, Kyle will suck Cartman's balls, but if not, Cartman will owe Kyle $10. To Kyle's shock, they do spot a leprechaun and give chase. They eventually and successfully catch it in a trap. The leprechaun says he was sent to warn of a terrorist attack, and that being chased by the boys has made him late, before vanishing. A triumphant Cartman declares that Kyle must now suck his balls, but Kyle initially refuses, asking why a leprechaun would be warning of a terrorist attack and insisting that there has to be a logical explanation. The next day, as Kyle is conversing with Stan, Kenny, Jimmy and Butters, a strange man suddenly appears, asking them if they have seen the leprechaun. When Kyle argues that leprechauns are just imaginary, the man tells him that just because something is imaginary doesn't mean it is not real. He then invites the boys for a ride in his magical "Imagination Flying Machine" while he serenades them with "The Imagination Song" (consisting simply of the word 'imagination' sung repetitively in various tonal inflection).

The group arrives in a place called Imaginationland, where all the beings created by human imagination reside. The imaginary creatures are all fascinated by the presence of "creators", and ask them about the leprechaun. At that moment a band of Islamist terrorists suddenly appear and set off a series of bombs, which kill hundreds of the imaginary creatures and destroy most of the city, with Stan watching. The boys flee on the back of Draco who flies them to safety. Butters, however, gets left behind, and he and the surviving imaginary characters are taken hostage by the terrorists. The next morning, Kyle wakes up in his bed, and is at first sure the whole thing might have been a dream — until he calls Stan who tells him the same story. They also discover that Butters is missing, much to his parents' shock.

Meanwhile, Cartman, angry that Kyle has refused to fulfill his part of their agreement, takes Kyle to court, where the judge sees the contract Kyle signed and orders Kyle to suck Cartman's balls within twenty-four hours or he will be arrested. The United States Department of Defense has received a video from the terrorists, which shows they are holding the survivors of the attack hostage, including Butters. Butters reads a note from the terrorists at gunpoint, and cries out to Stan and Kyle as the video ends. Unsure of how to counter the terrorists, they turn to Hollywood, hoping that they can use their creativity to get ideas. After being disappointed by several directors, including M. Night Shyamalan, who could only come up with twist endings, and Michael Bay, who could only come up with special effects sequences, they seek the advice of Mel Gibson, who suggests that they examine the video the terrorists sent and determine if there is anyone in it that somehow doesn't fit. The officials at the Pentagon immediately perform a background check on the video and realize that Butters is not an imaginary character. The general orders his men to locate both Stan and Kyle.

In Imaginationland, the terrorists take one of the creatures, "Rockety Rocket", and launch him at "the Barrier", the wall that separates the good and evil halves of Imaginationland. Despite Butters' attempts to stop them, the terrorists destroy the wall and unleash the evil imaginary creatures. Cartman, meanwhile, dons a Sultan's robe and throws a huge party, during which the other kids will watch Kyle suck his balls. Kyle has resigned himself to the task, and is about to walk into Cartman's house with Stan when members of the military arrive and take them away for questioning about Imaginationland. Cartman screams in anger about his plan being foiled, then quickly leaves home and hitchhikes with a trucker to Washington, D.C. to force Kyle to fulfill his end of the bet. He ends the episode stating, "Make no mistake, Kyle. Before this is over, you will suck my balls."

Production
Production for the episode began in July 2007, nearly three months before the final airing. This was uncharacteristic for South Park, as most episodes are produced in one week or less. The original intention was to make the story into a feature-length film, created as a theatrically released sequel to South Park: Bigger, Longer & Uncut, but there were myriad factors that led it to becoming a regular episode: they didn't feel it was a "big" enough idea, and the usage of licensed characters made it feel derivative. In addition, the driving schedule of producing new episodes contributed to its adoption as a mid-season show.

On the Monday preceding this episode's broadcast, Parker decided to make the episode a trilogy. Stone felt it fun to create a three-parter, as many television dramas at that time—24, Lost—were based on serialization. The day after "Imaginationland Episode I" aired, Parker completed the rest of the trilogy's story in a swift fashion: "I remember that Thursday morning writing every beat of the show on the board. It was the first time on a Thursday I stepped back from the board and the whole show was there. It felt so good."

Shortly after "Imaginationland" was originally broadcast, the site also featured T-shirts and hooded sweatshirts based on the episode. It featured Butters in a floating bubble, asking "Do I have to be the key?"

Reception and release

Episode I had over 3.4 million viewers and was the most watched program in all of television for Wednesday night among men between ages 18–24 and 34-49 and ranked #1 in cable among persons 18-49.

IGN gave the episode a rating of 9.1/10 and praised it for being "smart, inventive and provides a number of moments that'll stick with you long after it's over". 411Mania also gave the show a positive review, calling it "a great episode", praising it as an improvement over what the site perceived to be two weak episodes, and awarding it 7/10. TV Squad also gave a positive review saying that "They're still on a roll with another great episode." Josh Modell of The A.V. Club gave the trilogy a B grade, criticizing the slow pace of the main plot and calling it "more like an excuse for a nostalgia trip than a good arc." However, he praised Cartman's endless pursuit of his bet with Kyle and the return of the Christmas critters, calling their appearance, "some of the funniest moments in South Park's recent history,"

The Imaginationland Trilogy won the Primetime Emmy Award for Outstanding Animated Program (for Programming One Hour or More).

"Imaginationland Episode I", along with the thirteen other episodes from South Parks eleventh season, were released on a three-disc DVD set in the United States on August 12, 2008. The set includes brief audio commentaries by Parker and Stone for each episode.

 Cultural references 
The Mayor of Imaginationland is a pastiche of two characters. Aspects of his appearance and the "Imagination Song" allude to both Dreamfinder from Disney's Journey into Imagination and to Mr. Sophistication from The Killing of a Chinese Bookie.

The scene after the bomb goes off in Imaginationland, silently showing the devastation, is a parody of the beach storming scene in Saving Private Ryan.

The creators used the TV shows 24 and Battlestar Galactica as templates for plotting the structure of the trilogy.

 Film South Park: Imaginationland, or Imaginationland: The Movie''''', is all three episodes merged into a compilation film. The movie is uncensored and includes previously unreleased footage. It was released direct-to-video on March 11, 2008 in the United States and a year later in the United Kingdom on May 25. A few months later the movie was released for free online as a streaming video.

For reference, the DVD includes two bonus full-length episodes from previous seasons, "Woodland Critter Christmas" and "ManBearPig", as they feature the imaginary characters that reappeared in this film. Shortly after "Imaginationland" was originally broadcast, the website featured T-shirts and hooded sweatshirts based on the episode. It featured Butters in a floating bubble, asking "Do I have to be the key?"

Having a theme of good versus evil, the compilation movie (or the trilogy story arc) parodies fairy tales, fantasy films and horror films, and includes their affiliated superheros, supervillains and legendary creatures. Being a social satire of events, the movie also lampoons the American military, American politics, movie directors, hippie culture and the mass media regarding terrorism.

Mobile game
A mobile game adaptation developed by Mr.Goodliving for iOS was released on July 10, 2008.

References

External links

 "Imaginationland Episode I" Full episode at South Park Studios
 
 Guest list

Television about fairies and sprites
Television episodes about Islam
South Park episodes in multiple parts
South Park (season 11) episodes
Television episodes about terrorism
Cultural depictions of Mel Gibson
Cultural depictions of Michael Bay
Leprechauns in popular culture